"The Cowboy in Me" is a song written by Jeffrey Steele, Al Anderson and Craig Wiseman, and recorded by American country music artist Tim McGraw. It was released in November 2001 as the third single from McGraw's Set This Circus Down album.  The song reached Number One on the Billboard Hot Country Singles & Tracks (now Hot Country Songs) charts.  It reached Number One one week after McGraw's duet with Jo Dee Messina, "Bring On the Rain".

Content
In this song, Tim McGraw is acknowledging the destructive and sometimes selfish side of his personality, which he identifies as "the cowboy in [him]."

Critical reception
Kevin John Coyne of Country Universe gave the song a B grade, saying that the song "might be an amoebic form of the country lifestyle anthems that have flooded the genre in the years since it was released." He goes on to say that it is "certainly subtler and more refined than what’s come out since, and McGraw’s hit doesn’t include the head-pounding loudness that sinks so many other 'country' anthems."

Music video
The music video was directed by Sherman Halsey and was released in early 2002.

Chart performance
"The Cowboy in Me" debuted at number 48 on the U.S. Billboard Hot Country Singles & Tracks for the chart week of December 1, 2001. It reached a peak of number one on the chart dated March 16, 2002, remaining there for one week. During most of its chart run, it overlapped with McGraw's duet with Jo Dee Messina, "Bring On the Rain", which was the number one song one week earlier.

Certifications

References

Songs about cowboys and cowgirls
2001 singles
2001 songs
Tim McGraw songs
Songs written by Craig Wiseman
Songs written by Jeffrey Steele
Songs written by Al Anderson (NRBQ)
Song recordings produced by Byron Gallimore
Song recordings produced by Tim McGraw
Song recordings produced by James Stroud
Curb Records singles
Music videos directed by Sherman Halsey
Country ballads